"Pretty Noose" is a song by the American rock band Soundgarden. Written by the band's frontman, Chris Cornell, "Pretty Noose" was released in March 1996 as the first single from the band's fifth studio album, Down on the Upside (1996). The song reached number two on the Billboard Modern Rock Tracks chart. The song was included on Soundgarden's 1997 greatest hits album, A-Sides.

Origin and recording
"Pretty Noose" was written by frontman Chris Cornell. Drummer Matt Cameron said of the song,
That song for me was kind of interesting, because we were at the phase where we were just going to demo tunes. So I learned the tune and recorded it, and we ended up using that take. When we recorded that, I had walked to the studio (in Seattle) and my legs were really tired. But to make a long story short, I was trying to get a walking feel on the drum part. So it probably has a little weird shuffle to it probably from that walk that I took to the studio that day.

Composition
"Pretty Noose" has a distinctive opening wah-wah guitar riff. The song was written in C-G-C-G-G-E tuning, which the bass guitarist Ben Shepherd first introduced to the band with the song "Head Down" from Superunknown.

Lyrics
According to Cornell, "Pretty Noose" is about "an attractively packaged bad idea ... something that seems great at first and then comes back to bite you." Frank Kozik, the director of the song's music video, interpreted the song as "your average bad-girlfriend experience", an interpretation which Cornell agreed with.

Release and reception
"Pretty Noose" appeared on Billboard magazine's Hot 100 Airplay chart, reaching the top 40. The song peaked at number four on the Billboard Mainstream Rock Tracks chart and number two on the Billboard Modern Rock Tracks chart. It is notable for being the only song by the band to chart higher on the Modern Rock Tracks chart than on the Mainstream Rock Tracks chart. At the 1997 Grammy Awards, "Pretty Noose" received a nomination for Best Hard Rock Performance. Stephen Thomas Erlewine of AllMusic called the song "updated, muscular prog rock". Kerrang! ranked it at eleventh in their list of "The 20 greatest Soundgarden songs" and stated that the song "remains a benchmark for dark, angsty mid-’90s alt.rock."

Outside the United States, the single was released in the United Kingdom. In Canada, the song reached the top 50 on the Canadian Singles Chart, and later it charted on the Alternative Top 30 chart where it reached number one and became Soundgarden's first single to top that chart. "Pretty Noose" also reached number four on the Canadian Year End Alternative Top 50. "Pretty Noose" reached the UK Top 20 and was the last single from the album which charted in the UK Top 20. "Pretty Noose" peaked at number 14 in Australia. It reached the top 20 in New Zealand and was a top ten success in Finland.

"Pretty Noose" is available as downloadable content for the Rock Band series as a master track.

The song was upgraded and made available to download on July 19, 2011, for use in the Rock Band 3 music gaming platform in both Basic rhythm, and PRO mode which takes advantage of the use of a real guitar / bass guitar, along with standard MIDI-compatible electronic drum kits / keyboards in addition to up to three-part harmony vocals.

Music videos
The music video for "Pretty Noose" was directed by Frank Kozik. Kozik had previously been known for his work on posters and album art. The video blends animation with various scenes of the band members in a bar, an exotic dancer, Cameron riding a motorcycle, Shepherd being arrested, a tattoo parlor, and Cornell in a bedroom. In the original version of the video, Cornell is shown killing a woman. The video was released in May 1996.

Cornell said of the music video,
It's unlike anything else we've ever done ... In fact, I think it's unlike anything else anyone has ever done. Working with someone like Frank was really interesting because his approach was so fresh—he didn't know the rules that he's supposed to play under. He made the video what it is. It's really interesting and colorful. It's the kind of video that's still fun to look at after you've seen it a few times. That was very important to us. At this point in our lives, part of the challenge is to try new things, not to fall into the pattern of playing it safe. We did that on the video, and we did that on the album too.

MTV refused to show the full video, as it ends with an apparent murder. MuchMusic was given a revised version for its channel. Kozik said that the video was censored because it was "too heavy" for the "dipshits at MTV". He added, "They got a dead girl in that lame Stabbing Westward video so I don't understand their problem."

An alternative international version of the music video for "Pretty Noose" was released. This version was directed by Henry Shepherd (bass guitarist Ben Shepherd's brother), who had previously co-directed the "My Wave" music video for the band. The video simply features the band performing the song live in a studio. The footage is taken from a pre-release European promotional kit for Down on the Upside. The video was released to areas outside the United States, but began to be shown in the United States after Kozik's version debuted.

Live performances
"Pretty Noose" was performed on Saturday Night Live in May 1996 in support of Down on the Upside.  A recording of this performance can be found on the band's 2010 compilation album Telephantasm.

Track listing
All songs written by Chris Cornell, except where noted.
Promotional CD (US)
"Pretty Noose" – 4:12

CD (Europe) and 7" vinyl (Europe)
"Pretty Noose" – 4:12
"Jerry Garcia's Finger" (Matt Cameron, Cornell, Ben Shepherd, Kim Thayil) – 4:00

CD (Europe)
"Pretty Noose" – 4:12
"Applebite" (Cameron, Cornell) – 5:10
"An Unkind" (Shepherd) – 2:08
Interview with Eleven's Alain and Natasha – 8:57

Promotional CD (UK)
"Pretty Noose" – 4:12

Note
The club promo CD is a limited edition of 300 (making it the rarest of any Soundgarden release) and was packaged in a clear, soft plastic sleeve sealed with a large red sticker that doubles as the "liner notes".

Charts

See also
List of RPM Rock/Alternative number-one singles (Canada)

References

External links

1996 singles
Song recordings produced by Adam Kasper
Song recordings produced by Chris Cornell
Song recordings produced by Matt Cameron
Songs written by Chris Cornell
Soundgarden songs
1996 songs
American progressive rock songs